John Patrick Pender (born 19 November 1963) is an Irish retired professional footballer who played as a central defender. He is one of only two Burnley captains to have led the side to two promotions, the other being Martin Dobson.

He was capped five times by the Republic of Ireland Under-21 side and now lives in Telford, Shropshire.

Pender has been diagnosed with motor neurone disease, which his family attributes in part to head injuries sustained while playing.

References

External links
John Pender career stats at the Post-War Players Database

1963 births
Living people
Footballers from Luton
Republic of Ireland association footballers
Association football defenders
Wolverhampton Wanderers F.C. players
Charlton Athletic F.C. players
Bristol City F.C. players
Burnley F.C. players
Wigan Athletic F.C. players
Rochdale A.F.C. players
English Football League players
Republic of Ireland youth international footballers
People from Telford